Kebellavita Grama Niladhari Division is a Grama Niladhari Division of the Alawwa Divisional Secretariat of Kurunegala District of North Western Province, Sri Lanka. It has Grama Niladhari Division Code 1004.

Kebellavita is a surrounded by the Alawwa North, Galpottepola, Humbuluwa East, Ihala Kalalpitiya and Nugawela Grama Niladhari Divisions.

Demographics

Ethnicity 
The Kebellavita Grama Niladhari Division has a Sinhalese majority (100.0%). In comparison, the Alawwa Divisional Secretariat (which contains the Kebellavita Grama Niladhari Division) has a Sinhalese majority (99.6%)

Religion 
The Kebellavita Grama Niladhari Division has a Buddhist majority (98.7%). In comparison, the Alawwa Divisional Secretariat (which contains the Kebellavita Grama Niladhari Division) has a Buddhist majority (99.1%)

References 

Grama Niladhari Divisions of Alawwa Divisional Secretariat